Safwan AhmedMia (born 26 October), better known by his stage name SuperSaf, is a British technology reviewer and Internet personality best known for his technology-based YouTube channel, SuperSaf TV, which has over 1.9 million subscribers and over 380 million total video views.

Career
SuperSaf joined YouTube on 21 August 2011 but his first video was uploaded on 16 January 2012. His primary focus was DSLR and mirrored cameras but he later moved into reviewing and comparing smartphones and other technology.

He has been regularly featured on the BBC Asian Network, covering tech news and advice.

In January 2017, he won the British Muslim Award for Services Creativity & Technology.

In September 2017, he worked with FitBit for the launch of their new Smartwatch the FitBit Ionic. The campaign involved an Unboxing during a Sky Dive and was nominated for the 2018 Webby Awards for the Best Influencer Endorsements category.

In August 2018, he was featured in the BBC series My Asian Alter Ego talking about life as a British Asian.

In September 2019, SuperSaf was featured on number 22 of The Sunday Times UK's Top 100 Influencers List.

In November 2021, he was featured on The Today Show on the Islam Channel.

In February 2022, he won the Man of the Year British Muslim Award.

SuperSaf Speaks

SuperSaf is also host of a Tech Podcast named SuperSaf Speaks which focuses on consumer electronics, social media and surrounding topics. The first episode was aired on Spotify and Apple Podcasts along with the video format on YouTube on January 5, 2021.  High-profile guests on the podcast include MKBHD, Jenna Ezarik, and Michael Fisher (Mr Mobile).

Muslim Money Guys

In 2022, SuperSaf joined Wahed (company) as a co-host for the Muslim Money Guys Podcast, discussing topics around Islamic Finance and Riba-free halal investing! The first episode aired on October 18, 2022 on YouTube, Spotify and Apple Podcasts.  Notable guests include mixed martial artists Khabib Nurmagomedov, Islam Makhachev and footballer Paul Pogba.

Other work
Outside of YouTube, SuperSaf has been involved in numerous charity campaigns, appearing in the Stand Up to Cancer Live Stream in October 2018, being an ambassador for Islamic Relief for their #HonourHer campaign in April 2018 to help put an end to violence against women and girls worldwide and joining volunteers to deliver cakes as part of their #Cakes4Syria Campaign in May 2019. In September 2019, SuperSaf was one of the influencers that took part in the Alzheimer's Research UK #ShareTheOrange campaign to raise awareness about dementia.

References

External links

Living people
English YouTubers
People from Leicester
People from Leicestershire
English video bloggers
Technology blogs
Technology YouTubers
YouTube channels
Male bloggers
1986 births
YouTube channels launched in 2011